Wort is the liquid created by the mashing of malted barley to use in brewing beer.

Wort or Worts may also refer to:

 Wort (plant), plants containing the middle English word wort in their names
 Wört, a town in Baden-Württemberg, Germany

People
 James Worts (1792-1834) British distiller
 James Gooderham Worts (1818-1882) Canadian distiller

Businesses
 WORT, a listener-sponsored community radio station in Madison, Wisconsin
 Wort Hotel, Jackson, Wyoming, USA
 Luxemburger Wort, a daily newspaper in Luxembourg

See also
 St John's wort (disambiguation)
 Worting (disambiguation)
 Woert (disambiguation)
 Wart (disambiguation)